Wladislaw (von) Taczanowski (12 August 1825 – 13 March 1893) was an elected member of the German Reichstag in Berlin from March 1871 to January 1877 as a representative of the Polenpartei ("Polish Party"). A nobleman and member of the Taczanowski magnate dynasty, he is regarded as one of the influential Prussian-Polish politicians active during the early phase of the German Empire.

Taczanowski was born in Szypłów near Śrem in the Grand Duchy of Posen.

References

1825 births
1893 deaths
People from Środa Wielkopolska County
People from the Grand Duchy of Posen
Wladyslaw
19th-century Polish nobility
German people of Polish descent
Members of the 1st Reichstag of the German Empire
Members of the 2nd Reichstag of the German Empire
Prussian politicians